Major Sir Ralph (Hugo) Anstruther, 7th Baronet  (13 June 192119 May 2002) was a Scottish British Army officer and courtier.

Early life 
The only son of Captain Robert Edward Anstruther MC of the Black Watch, only son of Sir Ralph William Anstruther, 6th Baronet, and Marguerite Blanche Lily de Burgh, he was educated at Eton and at Magdalene College, Cambridge.

Career 
He commissioned into the Coldstream Guards on 29 November 1941, and was awarded the Military Cross in 1943. He later served in Malaya in 1950, and was mentioned in despatches. He was Equerry to the Queen Mother from 1959 to 1998, and Treasurer from 1961 to 1998. He was made a Commander of the Royal Victorian Order in 1967, and promoted to KCVO in 1976 and GCVO in 1992.

As the Queen Mother's treasurer, Anstruther had the difficult job of trying to limit her spending, which became effectively impossible in later years. He suffered two strokes, and at times appeared at Clarence House in a state of altered cognition. In 1998, he was replaced by Hon Nicholas Assheton, becoming Treasurer Emeritus, but resisted his replacement and evinced hostility to Assheton and Sir Alastair Aird, the Queen Mother's Private Secretary. The Queen Mother finally told him to go and stay in Scotland, which he did for the rest of his life.

He was also a Member of the Royal Company of Archers and Deputy Lieutenant of Fife from 1960 to 1997 and of Caithness from 1965.

Titles 
He succeeded his grandfather in 1934 to the baronetcy of Anstruther of Balcaskie, and in 1980 succeeded his cousin, Sir Windham Eric Francis Carmichael-Anstruther, 8th Baronet, to the baronetcy of Anstruther of Anstruther. With the latter he also became Hereditary Carver to the Queen. He was succeeded to the baronetcies by his cousin Ian Anstruther.

Ancestry

References 

1921 births
2002 deaths
Baronets in the Baronetage of Nova Scotia
Knights Grand Cross of the Royal Victorian Order
Coldstream Guards officers
Recipients of the Military Cross
British Army personnel of World War II
People educated at Eton College
Alumni of Magdalene College, Cambridge
Equerries
Deputy Lieutenants of Fife
Deputy Lieutenants of Caithness
British Army personnel of the Malayan Emergency
Members of the Royal Company of Archers
Ralph, 7th Baronet